Tando Jan Muhammad is located in Taluka Digri, Mirpurkhas Sindh Pakistan. It is situated near District Mirpurkhas about 60 km from Mirpurkhas city. This city was built by Mir Jan Muhammad talpur. The Current population of the city is above 50000, and Many Famous people's belongs to this city, on of them was late Mir Haji Khuda Bux khan talpur, He belonged to the family of Late Mir Jan Muhammad talpur, He was a political leader of that time, He made great contribution to this city, In the Late 50's and early 60's, he started to developed main infrastructure of city,His great contribution are  

 High School of Tando Jan Muhammad,
 The Hostel of the High School, 
 Degree College of Tando Jan Muhammad,
In that time these things were not quietly known to the common people, Now everyone has access to free education,
But the current condition of Tando Jan Muhammad is very bad, now this city is surrounded with many problems, Problems are following,

 Bad Drainage system

 No Good Political Leadership

 Water problem

 Incomplete LPOD

Populated places in Sindh
Mirpur Khas District